Dominic Matthew Jesse Barrington is a British Anglican cleric.

On 13 July 2022 he was formally appointed the next Dean of York, succeeding Jonathan Frost. He was installed as Dean during a special service held on 12 November.

References

Deans of York
Alumni of Hatfield College, Durham
Year of birth missing (living people)
Living people